{{DISPLAYTITLE:C6H12S}}
The molecular formula C6H12S (molar mass: 116.22 g/mol, exact mass: 116.0660 u) may refer to:

 Cyclohexanethiol
 Thiepane